Carlephyton glaucophyllum is a species of arum endemic to Madagascar.

Description
It differs from the two other species in the genus in that it has some bisexual flowers present concurrent to the female flowers. It has a short spadix and the leaves are glaucous.

It flowers in December. The berries are possibly yellowish.

Range and habitat
Carlephyton glaucophyllum is native to northern and northeastern Madagascar, where it is known from four populations. It is found in dry forests between sea level and 500 meters elevation. It is typically found growing in clusters. 

It was described by Josef Bogner in 1972.

References

Aroideae
Endemic flora of Madagascar
Plants described in 1972
Flora of the Madagascar dry deciduous forests